The Iranian Journal of Fuzzy Systems is a peer-reviewed scientific journal published by the University of Sistan and Baluchestan. It covers research on theory and applications of fuzzy sets and systems in the areas of foundations, pure mathematics, artificial intelligence, uncertainty modeling, and other related aspects.

Abstracting and indexing 
The Iranian Journal of Fuzzy Systems is abstracted and indexed in Scopus, Islamic World Science Citation Database, Science Citation Index Expanded, Mathematical Reviews, Zentralblatt MATH, and EBSCO databases. According to the Journal Citation Reports, the journal has a 2011 impact factor of 1.056.

References

External links 

English-language journals
Mathematics journals
Open access journals
Publications established in 2004
University of Sistan and Baluchestan
Academic journals of Iran